UPMC Magee-Women's Hospital known simply as Magee-Womens Hospital, is a nationally ranked, 335-bed non-profit, full service specialty hospital located in South Oakland, Pittsburgh, Pennsylvania. Magee-Womens is a part of the University of Pittsburgh Medical Center (UPMC). The hospital is near UPMC's flagship campus which houses Presbyterian and Montefiore. While the hospital is UPMC's primary facility for women's health, the hospital is a full service hospital that also serves men. As the hospital is a teaching hospital, it is affiliated with University of Pittsburgh School of Medicine.

History 
History of Magee goes back to the early 1900s when on January 19, 1911, Mrs. Alfred Birdsall delivered the first baby at a makeshift hospital in the former home of Christopher Magee. The hospital is built on the grounds of the home of legendary Pittsburgh political boss Christopher Magee and named in honor of his mother, Elizabeth Steel Magee.

In 1931, Magee Hospital and the University of Pittsburgh created an agreement to establish a 28-bed teaching unit at the hospital. In 1962 Magee Hospital merged with Pittsburgh Woman's Hospital, and became Magee-Womens Hospital.

The hospital merged with UPMC in 1999. In 2011 the hospital undertook an expansion of its main facility which was completed in June, 2012. The expansion added six floors, increased the number of beds from 318 to 335 (including 14 additional intensive care rooms), and expanded the surgical and ambulatory facilities.

About 
UPMC Magee- Hospital is a UPMC specialty hospital that serves as its primary facility for women's health. While primarily a womans hospital, it has offered some services for men since the 1960s.

The hospital is located in the Oakland neighborhood of Pittsburgh near UPMC Presbyterian, a location it has been at since its fourth year in 1915. It currently is equipped with 335 beds, an emergency room and ambulatory facilities on four floors which allows it to offer all possible services under one roof including family medicine physicians, gastroenterologists, dermatologists, rheumatologists, pulmonary specialists, orthopedists, urologists and neurologists.

Magee- has a staff of 2,500, of which 1,500 are medically licensed. It also operates a satellite hospital in the city's northern suburbs as part as the UPMC Passavant facility as well as 9 metro area imaging clinics.

10,000 births are performed at Magee each year, which accounts for 45 percent of all births in Allegheny County.

UPMC Hamot campus 

UPMC Hamot Women's Hospital is a five-story, 165,000 square-foot, 93-bed stand-alone hospital that opened in 2011. The hospital houses obstetrics, neonatology, and gynecology specialities of UPMC Hamot and includes a Level III neonatal intensive care unit. As of October 2013, it also houses the Pediatrics wing of UPMC Hamot.

In December 2015, UPMC Hamot Women's Hospital was renamed to Magee-Womens Hospital - UPMC Hamot Campus to reflect its alignment with Magee-Womens Hospital of UPMC.

Awards 
In 2005 Magee-Women's was rated as the #17 best hospital in the United States in the field of gynecology on the U.S. News & World Report.

In 2014 and 2017 the hospital was named to the "100 hospitals with great women's health programs" by Becker's Hospital Review.

As of 2016–17, Magee-Womens ranked nationally as #12 nationally in gynecology and #32 nationally in orthopedics on the U.S. News & World Report.

The hospital ranked nationally as #26 in orthopedics, high performing in cancer, and high performing in urology on the 2017-18 U.S. News & World Report.

In 2020 the hospital was recognized by Human Rights Campaign Foundation as a "Top Performer" in their forward thinking LGBTQ policies and initiatives.

In 2020 Magee-Womens was awarded three Women's Choice Awards as top 7% in bariatrics, top 2% in cancer care, and a best hospital in patient experience.

UPMC Magee-Women's Hospital was ranked nationally as #47 in gynecology on the 2020-21 U.S. News & World Report and ranked as high performing in hip and knee replacement.

See also 

 University of Pittsburgh Medical Center
 University of Pittsburgh School of Medicine
 UPMC Presbyterian
 UPMC Children's Hospital of Pittsburgh
 UPMC Heart and Transplant Hospital

References

External links 

 

Hospital buildings completed in 2012
University of Pittsburgh Medical Center
Hospital buildings completed in 1962
Women's hospitals
University of Pittsburgh
Teaching hospitals in Pennsylvania
Hospitals in Pennsylvania
Women in Pennsylvania